Cassio Cardoselli (born 26 July 1998) is an Italian footballer who plays as a midfielder for  club Virtus Francavilla.

Club career

Carrarese 
On 3 September 2017, Cardoselli made his professional debut as a substitute replacing Francesco Tavano in the 89th minute of a 1–0 home win over Pro Piacenza. On 17 September, Cardoselli played his first match as a starter, a 3–0 home win over Olbia, he was replaced by Daniel Kofi Agyei in the 82nd minute. On 26 November he played his first entire match for Carrarese, a 4–1 home win over Pontedera. On 24 March 2018, Cardoselli scored his first professional goal, as a substitute, in the 92nd minute of a 2–0 away win over Pisa. Cardoselli ended his first professional season with 30 appearances, 1 goal and 2 assists.

Entella 
On 20 August 2020 he signed for Serie B side Virtus Entella. On 12 August 2021, he was loaned to Siena.

Virtus Francavilla
On 1 September 2022, Cardoselli joined Virtus Francavilla.

Career statistics

Club

References

External links
 

1998 births
Living people
Footballers from Rome
Italian footballers
Association football midfielders
Serie B players
Serie C players
S.S. Lazio players
Carrarese Calcio players
Virtus Entella players
A.C.N. Siena 1904 players
Virtus Francavilla Calcio players